This article contains a list of fossil-bearing stratigraphic units in the state of Connecticut, U.S.

Sites

See also

 Paleontology in Connecticut

References

 

Connecticut
Stratigraphic units
Stratigraphy of Connecticut
Connecticut geography-related lists
United States geology-related lists